Otto Alexander Bernhard Wallmark (December 12, 1830 – November 20, 1901) was an American politician and businessman.

Wallmark was born in Asige, Halland County, Sweden. He emigrated to the United States and settled in Chisago County, Minnesota in 1854. He lived in Chisago City, Minnesota with his wife and family and was a merchant. He served as the Chisago  County Auditor and also served as the postmaster for Chisago City. Wallmark served in the Minnesota Senate from 1887 to 1890 and was a Republican.

References

1830 births
1901 deaths
Swedish emigrants to the United States
People from Chisago County, Minnesota
Businesspeople from Minnesota
Minnesota postmasters
Republican Party Minnesota state senators